Semavi Özgür (born 15 February 1982) is a Turkish former football player.

References

1982 births
Living people
Turkish footballers
Association football midfielders
Association football defenders
MKE Ankaragücü footballers
Manisaspor footballers
Çaykur Rizespor footballers
TKİ Tavşanlı Linyitspor footballers
Süper Lig players